Our Lady of Lourdes Hospital is a public hospital located in Drogheda, County Louth, Ireland. It is managed by RCSI Hospitals.

History
The hospital, which was commissioned on the initiative of Mother Mary Martin of the Medical Missionaries of Mary, was opened as Our Lady of Lourdes International Missionary Training Hospital in 1955.

Obstetrician Michael Neary was found to have performed an excessive number of hysterectomies during Caesarean sections in hospital during the late 1970s.

The Catholic ethos of the Medical Missionaries of Mary has been blamed for some controversial practices in relation to abortion and contraception. In 1983, after Sheila Hodgers died of cancer days after giving birth, an article in The Irish Times alleged that anti-cancer medication and painkillers were withheld to protect her foetus. The hospital was the last in Ireland which performed symphysiotomy (widening of the pelvis during childbirth) and did not cease the practice until 1983.

Services
The hospital provides 340 beds, of which 30 are reserved for acute day cases.

References

External links

Drogheda
Buildings and structures in Drogheda
Health Service Executive hospitals
Hospitals in County Louth
Hospital buildings completed in 1955
Hospitals established in 1955
1955 establishments in Ireland
20th-century architecture in the Republic of Ireland